Vivián Alberty (born 22 May 1973) is a Puerto Rican diver. She competed in the women's 3 metre springboard event at the 1996 Summer Olympics.

References

External links
 

1973 births
Living people
Puerto Rican female divers
Olympic divers of Puerto Rico
Divers at the 1996 Summer Olympics
Sportspeople from San Juan, Puerto Rico